Jo Davidson (March 30, 1883 – January 2, 1952) was an American sculptor. Although he specialized in realistic, intense portrait busts, Davidson did not require his subjects to formally pose for him; rather, he observed and spoke with them. He worked primarily with clay, while the final products were typically cast in terra-cotta or bronze, or carved from marble.

Background

Davidson was born in New York City, where he was educated before going to work in the atelier of American sculptor Hermon Atkins MacNeil. He subsequently moved to Paris in 1907 to study sculpture at the Ecole des Beaux-Arts.

Career

Art

After returning to the United States, he was befriended by Gertrude Vanderbilt Whitney, who purchased some of his work.

In 1911 Davidson secured his first solo gallery shows.  In 1927 he was one of a dozen sculptors invited by the oilman E. W. Marland to compete for a commission for a Pioneer Woman statue in Ponca City. Each was paid a commission to produce a small model, and the dozen works were exhibited in major cities in the US. Davidson did not win the commission.

In 1934 Davidson won the National Academy of Design's Maynard Prize. In 1944, he was elected into the National Academy of Design as an Associate Academician. In 1947 the American Academy of Arts and Letters hosted a retrospective featuring nearly 200 of his works. In the summer of 1949, Davidson was one of 250 sculptors who exhibited in the 3rd Sculpture International held at the Philadelphia Museum of Art.

Among Davidson's commissions are a design for a United States War Industries badge, a collection of pieces for the Government of France to commemorate the first victory of the Troupes de Marine, and bronze busts of the leaders of the First World War Allies. His portraits of world leaders and celebrated figures gained him international acclaim. He created statues of oilman and future governor E. W. Marland and his two adoptive grown children.

Politics 

Davidson served as chairman of the Independent Citizens Committee of the Arts, Sciences and Professions (ICCASP), a leftist-liberal group that supported the policies of President Franklin D. Roosevelt and his re-election. In 1946 this group merged with the National Citizens Political Action Committee (NCPAC) to become the Progressive Citizens of America (PCA); Davidson became co-chairman (the other chairman being Dr. Frank Kingdon).

PCA struggled during tensions of the Cold War, with its members under suspicion by the House Un-American Activities Committee (HUAC) for leftist leanings. It worked for racial equality, economic justice and civil liberties. Important segments of the PCA became the base for Henry A. Wallace's candidacy for U.S. President in 1948 on the Progressive Party ticket.

Commissions

Manuel Azaña
Julio Álvarez del Vayo
James Barrie
Nicholas Murray Butler
Charlie Chaplin
Madame Chiang Kai-shek
Joseph Conrad
Émile Coué (who was also a sculptor in his spare time)
Clarence Darrow
Charles G. Dawes - bust, part of the United States Senate Vice Presidential Bust Collection
Arthur Conan Doyle
Albert Einstein
Dwight D. Eisenhower
Marshal Ferdinand Foch
Anatole France
Mahatma Gandhi
André Gide
Emma Goldman
W. Averell Harriman
Frank Harris
Dolores Ibárruri (La Pasionaria)
Robinson Jeffers
James Joyce
Otto Kahn
Helen Keller
Rudyard Kipling
Robert M. La Follette, Wisconsin contribution to National Statuary Hall, United States Capitol
D. H. Lawrence
Edward Drummond Libbey, founder of the Libbey Glass Company and the Toledo Museum of Art in Toledo, Ohio
Henry Luce
John Marin
E. W. Marland
Lydie Marland and her brother George Roberts Marland
Lowell Mellett
Andrew Mellon
Constancia de la Mora
General John J. Pershing
John D. Rockefeller
Will Rogers (posthumous) - the original statue donated to the Will Rogers Memorial Hospital in Saranac Lake, New York
Will Rogers (posthumous) - bronze, Oklahoma contribution to National Statuary Hall, United States Capitol, erected in 1939
Franklin Delano Roosevelt  installed at the Franklin D. Roosevelt Four Freedoms Park
Ida Rubinstein
Carl Sandburg
E. W. Scripps
George Bernard Shaw
Lincoln Steffens
Gertrude Stein
Rabindranath Tagore
Marshal Tito
Getúlio Vargas
H. G. Wells
Henry A. Wallace - bust, part of the United States Senate Vice Presidential Bust Collection
Walt Whitman (posthumous) - full-body bronze statue at the Walt Whitman Bridge in Philadelphia, and in Bear Mountain State Park, New York.
Gertrude Vanderbilt Whitney
 Walt Whitman statue
 Evan Williams (Opera tenor)
Woodrow Wilson
Israel Zangwill

Collections

Some of Davidson's work is in the National Gallery of Art.

He also designed a statue of Henry D. Thoreau, the author of the 1854 book Walden.  The statue is located at Walden Pond State Reservation in Concord, Massachusetts.

In 2006, The Smithsonian Institution's National Portrait Gallery opened a permanent exhibition, "Jo Davidson: Biographer in Bronze", showcasing fourteen Davidson works in terracotta and bronze, including portraits of Gertrude Stein and Lincoln Steffens.

References

Sources
 Armstrong, Craven et al., 220 Years of American Sculpture, Whitney Museum of Art & David R. Goodine, Publisher, NY  1976
 Compilation of Works of Art and Other Objects in the United States Capitol, Prepared by the Architect of the Capitol under the Direction of the Joint Committee on the Library, United States Government Printing Office, Washington D.C.  1965
 Connor, Janis and Joel Rosenkranz, photographs by David Finn, Rediscoveries in American Sculpture: Studio Works, 1893 - 1939, University of Texas Press, Austin TX  1989
 Craven, Wayne, Sculpture in America: From the Colonial Period to the Present, Thomas Y, Crowell Company, NY  1968
 Davidson, Jo, Between Sittings: an informal autobiography, The Dial Press, NY  1951
 
Homepage of the National Portrait Gallery, Washington, DC: Permanent Exhibitions.

1883 births
1952 deaths
New York (state) Democrats
American people of Russian-Jewish descent
American alumni of the École des Beaux-Arts
Artists from New York City
20th-century American sculptors
American male sculptors
National Sculpture Society members
Sculptors from New York (state)
20th-century American male artists
Members of the American Academy of Arts and Letters